Loitering with Intent is a 2014 American comedy film directed by Adam Rapp and written by Ivan Martin and Michael Godere. The film stars Ivan Martin, Michael Godere, Brian Geraghty, Isabelle McNally, Natasha Lyonne, and Marisa Tomei. It premiered on April 18, 2014 at the Tribeca Film Festival. The film was released through video on demand on December 16, 2014, prior to a limited release on January 16, 2015 by The Orchard.

Cast

 Ivan Martin as Raphael
 Michael Godere as Dominic
 Sam Rockwell as Wayne
 Brian Geraghty as Devon
 Isabelle McNally as Ava
 Natasha Lyonne as Kaplan
 Marisa Tomei as Gigi
 Britne Oldford as Izzy
 Patch Darragh as Carter
 Aya Cash as Jesse
 Adam Tomei as Nino

Release
The film had its world premiere at the Tribeca Film Festival on April 18, 2014. Shortly after, it was announced that The Orchard had acquired U.S distribution rights to the film. It went onto screen at the Key West Film Festival on November 15, 2014. The film was released through video on demand on December 16, 2014, prior to a limited release on January 16, 2015.

Critical response
Loitering with Intent received mixed reviews from film critics. It holds a 33% rating on the review aggregator website Rotten Tomatoes, based on 24 reviews, with an average rating of 5.2/10. On Metacritic the film holds a rating of 49 out of 100, based on 11 critics, indicating "mixed or average reviews".

References

External links
 

2014 comedy films
American comedy films
2010s English-language films
2010s American films